Volodymyr Oleksandrovych Sheiko (born January 11, 1962, Kharkiv) is a Ukrainian conductor, Honored Artist of Ukraine, People's Artist of Ukraine, the director of the Association "Music," and the chief conductor of the Ukrainian Radio Symphony Orchestra.

Biography

He was born in Kharkiv.

Education

In 1981 he graduated from Poltava State Music School named after MV Lysenko as a choirmaster and music theorist.

In 1988 he graduated from the Tchaikovsky Kyiv State Conservatory with a degree in opera and symphony conducting (Prof. Stefan Turchak) and choral conducting (Prof. Lev Venediktov).

In 1989-1991 he was an intern at the Bolshoi Opera and Ballet Theater (Moscow), directed by Fuat Mansurov.

Creative activity

Since 1988 he has been the conductor-producer of the Kyiv Academic Operetta Theater.

In October 1990, he created the country's first non-governmental symphony orchestra "Ukraine," with which from 1991 to 2002 he conducted extensive concert and touring activities (Ukraine, Russia, Italy, France, Portugal, Poland, Croatia, Switzerland), made numerous recordings. on Ukrainian radio and television, has published a number of CDs (Russia, Italy, Great Britain, Switzerland), organized international art festivals "Meetings for Easter" (Kyiv, Ukraine - 2000, 2001, 2002) and "Tenoratorio" (Solothurn, Switzerland - 1999, 2000, 2001), was one of the organizers and director of the opening of VERDIANO-2001 (Busseto, Italy - 2001).

From 1995 to 2005 he was the chief conductor of the Kyiv Academic Operetta Theater, where he staged 15 plays, including George Gershwin's "Porgy and Bess," Johann Strauss II's "The Gypsy Baron" and "Night in Venice," Emmerich Kálmán's "Maritza," "Count of Luxembourg" by Franz Lehár and many others.

In August 2005, he headed the Honored Academic Symphony Orchestra of the National Radio Company of Ukraine. He has carried out a number of large-scale creative projects, including Mozart's "Repentance of David," A. Karamanov's "Symphonic Gospel," Shostakovich's "Execution of Stepan Razin," Verdi's "Requiem," and Rossini's "Stabat Mater," "Carmina Burana" by Carl Orff (his own stage version), "Fantasies in jazz tones" by O. Saratsky, a series of joint TV and radio projects of the National Radio Company and the National TV Company of Ukraine "Art Stories" and many others.

Sheiko participates in the annual international festivals "Kyiv Music Fest" and "Music Premieres of the Season" (Kyiv, Ukraine).

Under the direction of Volodymyr Sheiko, the Ukrainian Radio Symphony Orchestra recorded 300 masterpieces of world and Ukrainian music for the National Radio Foundation. The main recordings are made in the Recording House of Ukrainian Radio.

Over the past six years, he has toured with the orchestra in 17 countries, including the People's Republic of China, South Korea, United Arab Emirates, Iran, Algeria, Tunisia, Spain, Italy, France, Portugal, the Netherlands, Luxembourg, Belgium, Romania, Poland, and Belarus. He has conducted on such stages as the Glinka Chapel Hall (Saint Petersburg, Russia); Concert House (Vienna, Austria); Concertgebouw (Amsterdam, Netherlands); Queen Elisabeth Hall (Antwerp, Belgium); Sferisterio di Macerata (Italy), Teatro Carlo Felice (Genoa, Italy), Teatro Petruzzelli (Bari, Italy), Teatro Comunale Ponchielli (Cremona, Italy), Teatro Luciano Pavarotti (Modena, Italy), Roman Theatre of Ascoli Piceno (Italy), Teatro Politeama, Palermo (Italy); Auditorio Nacional de Musica and Teatro Monumental (Madrid, Spain); Grand Teatre del Liceu and Palau de la Musica (Barcelona, Spain); Coliseo, Casa da Música (Porto, Portugal), Coliseu dos Recreios (Lisbon, Portugal); Colosseum (Nimes, France), Teatro Romano (Vienne, France); Opera and Ballet Theater (Timisoara, Romania); Algerian National Theater (Algiers, Algeria), Mufdi Zakaria Palace (El Madania, Algeria), City Hall (Seoul, South Korea), Colosseum (El Jem, Tunisia), Amphitheater (Carthage, Tunisia), City Hall (Hong Kong, PRC), and the National Philharmonic (Beijing, China).

He is fascinated by the idea of the "visualization" of symphonic music.

Distinctions

 In 2003 he was awarded the honorary title of "Honored Artist of Ukraine" - for significant personal contribution to the socio-economic and cultural development of the capital of Ukraine - the city of Kyiv.
 In 2005 he was awarded the Order of Saint Vladimir III degree
 In 2005 he was awarded the Diploma of the Verkhovna Rada of Ukraine
 In 2012 he was awarded the Diploma of the Cabinet of Ministers of Ukraine
 Honorary award of the Ministry of Culture of Ukraine
 "Badge of Honor" of the Kyiv City Council
 In 2015 he was awarded the honorary title of "People's Artist of Ukraine"
 In 2019, he won the Shevchenko Prize in the category "Musical Art" - for audio recordings of works by Ukrainian composers at the Ukrainian Radio Foundation, and concert programs from 2013 to 2018.
 In 2020 he was awarded the Order of Merit (Ukraine), III class
 In 2021 became corresponding member of the National Academy of Arts of Ukraine

Nominations

Taras Shevchenko National Prize of Ukraine 2015. Concert programs of 2009-2014 were nominated for the Concert and Performing Arts nomination: 160 concerts, each of which became a notable spiritual and educational event, highlighted the active artistic and social position of the artist and received a wide positive public response. In particular, some of the largest concert cycles of the artist were music media projects "Art Stories" and "RadioSymphony_UA," where Volodymyr Sheiko participated as artistic director, project conductor, project developer, and director.

References

External links
 сторінка на сайті НРКУ 
 Катерина Константинова. Диригент Володимир Шейко: «В оркестрі не хочу керувати рабами, хочу працювати з колегами» // «Дзеркало тижня. Україна» № 27, 10 серпня 2012

Ukrainian conductors (music)
Living people
1962 births
Laureates of the Honorary Diploma of the Verkhovna Rada of Ukraine
Recipients of the Honorary Diploma of the Cabinet of Ministers of Ukraine